Club Deportivo Leganés, S.A.D. is a football club based in Leganés, Community of Madrid, Spain, that currently competes in Segunda División, the second tier of the Spanish league system. It was founded on 23 June 1928. It holds home games at the Estadio Municipal de Butarque, which seats 12,454 spectators.

History
The club was officially founded on 23 June 1928. Its first president was Ramón del Hierro. However the club had to suspend operations in 1936 due to the Spanish civil war, where they remained inactive until they reformed on 4 September 1946.

Leganés played the vast majority of its existence in the lower leagues. In 1977 the club regained promotion to the fourth division, where it had played before for seven years when the category was still the third level.

After a steady progression, Leganés reached the new division three in 1987, being promoted to the second division six years later and maintaining its league status for 11 seasons; during this timeframe, it collected two consecutive eighth places (best) from 1995 to 1997.

On 24 December 2008, Victoria Pavón and Felipe Moreno acquired a majority stake of the club. Since July 2009, Victoria Pavón has been the president of the club.

In the 2013–14 season, Leganés promoted to Segunda División after 10 seasons in Segunda B.

In the 2015–16 season, for the first time in their history, Leganés earned promotion to La Liga, which was sealed on 4 June 2016 with a 1–0 away win against CD Mirandés, thus becoming the fifth team from Community of Madrid to ever play in La Liga after Real Madrid, Atlético Madrid, Rayo Vallecano, and Getafe. They remained in the top flight for four seasons, reaching a peak of 13th in 2018–19, before relegation in the last game of the following season, a 2–2 home draw with Real Madrid. During this spell, the team qualified for the first time to the semifinals of the Copa del Rey, by eliminating Real Madrid in the quarterfinals thanks to a 2–1 win at Santiago Bernabéu Stadium.

Fans
The fans have friendly relation with ultras group Gate 12 of Egaleo FC, the towns of Egaleo and Leganés happen to be twinned too. They also have friendly ties with Reading F.C. of England, partially due to sharing their blue and white colours. Their biggest rival is Getafe with whom they contest the South Madrid derby.

Season to season

4 seasons in La Liga
16 seasons in Segunda División
16 seasons in Segunda División B
19 seasons in Tercera División

Current squad
.

Reserve team

Out on loan

Club officials

Current technical staff

Board of directors 
{| class="wikitable"
|-
!Office
!Name
|-
| President
| Jeff Luhnow
|-
| First vice president
| Felipe Moreno
|-
| Second vice president
| Juan Antonio Ortiz
|-
| Secretary
| Txema Indias
|-
| General director
| Martín Ortega
|-
| Financial director
| Ángel Sánchez
|-
| Security director
| Rafael De Castro
|-
| Communication, marketing and social director
| Daniel Abanda
|-
| Medical director
| Alberto Lam
|-
| Academy director
| Jorge Broto

Honours
Segunda División B: 1992–93
Tercera División: 1985–86

Famous players
Note: this list includes players that have played at least 100 league games and have reached international status.

List of coaches

Reserve team

References

External links

Official website 
Futbolme team profile 
Leganes Betting profile 

 
Football clubs in the Community of Madrid
Association football clubs established in 1928
1928 establishments in Spain
Segunda División clubs
La Liga clubs